Boletus semigastroideus is a species of secotioid fungus in the family Boletaceae.  It was originally described in 1942 as Secotium areolatum by New Zealand-based mycologist Gordon Herriot Cunningham  and then renamed as Notholepiota areolata as the type species of the genus Notholepiota by Egon Horak in 1971. A molecular phylogenetics study found it to belong in Boletus sensu stricto, but the name Boletus areolatus was preoccupied, so it was renamed Boletus semigastroideus.

See also
 List of Boletus species

References

External links
 

semigastroideus
Fungi described in 1942
Fungi of New Zealand
Secotioid fungi